Hadik is a surname. 

Notable people from the noble Hungarian Hadik de Futak family include:
András Hadik (1710–1790), Austrian field marshal
Endre Hadik (1862–1931), Hungarian politician
János Hadik (1863–1933), Hungarian politician
Karl Joseph Hadik (1756–1800), Austrian general
Miksa Hadik (1868–1921), Austro-Hungarian diplomat

Hungarian-language surnames